Frank Beckett Lewis ARIBA (27 September 1861 – 1 November 1932) was an English architect based in Nottingham.

Career
He was born on 27 September 1861 in Nottingham, the son of William Lewis (Cork Merchant) and Elizabeth. He was articled to Arthur Forsell Kirby of Nottingham from 1877 to 1882. He then became assistant to Thomas Chambers Hine and George Thomas Hine where he stayed until 1886. He then moved to be the Deputy Borough Engineer in Nottingham under Arthur Brown.

In 1888 he was appointed an Associate of the Royal Institute of British Architects.

He was appointed Nottingham City Architect in 1901, a position he held until 1912 when he was succeeded by his assistant, Arthur Dale.

He died on 1 November 1932 and left an estate valued at £8,416 9s 11d.

Notable works

References

1861 births
1932 deaths
Architects from Nottingham
Associates of the Royal Institute of British Architects